The Seguin Covered Bridge, also called the Upper Covered Bridge and the Sequin Covered Bridge, is a wooden covered bridge that crosses Lewis Creek in Charlotte, Vermont on Roscoe Road.  It was built about 1850, and is a distinctive variant of a Burr arch design.  It was listed on the National Register of Historic Places in 1974.

Naming
A sign posted in the bridge by the Town of Charlotte identifies the name of the bridge as "Seguin" (with a letter "G") for one of the families who owned land surrounding it.  It was listed on the National Register as "Sequin" (with the letter "Q"), an error that has since propagated widely.

Description
The Seguin Covered Bridge stands in a rural area of eastern Charlotte, spanning the west-flowing Lewis Creek in a north-south orientation on Roscoe Road. It rests on stone abutments that have been mortared and faced in concrete. The trusses consist of vertical posts and diagonal bracing, flanked on either side by laminated arches. The exterior is finished in vertical board siding, which extends around to the insides of the portals. The siding ends short of the gabled roof, leaving an opening between the two.

History
The bridge was built about 1850 by an unknown builder; it is one of three surviving covered bridges in the town of Charlotte, and one of nine in the state with the Burr arch design.  Extensive repairs were made in 1949 and again in 1994; the latter repairs being made by Paul Ide and Jan Lewandoski.  A new roof was added in 2001.

The bridge underwent a major rehabilitation in 2016.  This work raised concerns among bridge preservationists, as it included alterations that put at risk the bridge's distinctive overhead bracing, which is not found on other bridges in the state.  Alterations also include rebuilding the road deck to increase the weight limit to seven tons (from the previous five).

See also
National Register of Historic Places listings in Chittenden County, Vermont
List of Vermont covered bridges
List of bridges on the National Register of Historic Places in Vermont

References

Buildings and structures in Charlotte, Vermont
Bridges completed in 1850
Covered bridges on the National Register of Historic Places in Vermont
Truss bridges in the United States
Wooden bridges in Vermont
Bridges in Chittenden County, Vermont
Tourist attractions in Chittenden County, Vermont
National Register of Historic Places in Chittenden County, Vermont
Road bridges on the National Register of Historic Places in Vermont
Burr Truss bridges in the United States
1850 establishments in Vermont